Lebanon competed at the 2022 Mediterranean Games in Oran, Algeria from 25 June to 6 July 2022.

Archery 

Lebanon competed in archery.

Men

Boxing

Lebanon participated in boxing.

Men

Women

Fencing

Lebanon participated in fencing.

Men

Women

Judo

Lebanon participated in judo.

Men

Women

Sailing

Lebanon participated in sailing.

Men

Weightlifting

Lebanon participated in weightlifting.

Women

References

External links

Nations at the 2022 Mediterranean Games
2022
Mediterranean Games